New Ireland Assurance Company plc is an insurance company in the Republic of Ireland with origins in Ireland's independence movement. It was founded as the New Ireland Assurance Collecting Society in January 1918.

References

External links

Companies established in 1918
Insurance companies of Ireland